Kenabeek is a locality and unincorporated community in geographic Henwood Township in the Unorganized West Part of Timiskaming District, in northeastern Ontario, Canada. The community is located on Ontario Highway 65, approximately halfway between Elk Lake and New Liskeard.

Geography
Kenabeek and its surrounding area is mostly sand with a bit of rock, and a shallow amount of topsoil, and therefore is not good agricultural land. There are a number of small lakes within two or three miles (5 km) of Kenabeek, mostly privately owned. Many are muskeg lakes and others are surrounded by swamp. Several of the lakes are home to loons. Land in the Kenabeek area is mostly used for growing hay and potatoes, and in a few cases for grazing a small number of cattle for local use.

History
Other than farms (160 acre plots, a few with multiple homes, usually multi-generation family) there are no houses falling within the village, so the town is considered to be the General Store, Post Office and volunteer Fire Station.

Kenabeek and the surrounding area was hit by the Great Fire of 1922 (the Haileybury fire of 1922) which wiped out hundreds of acres of land and many homes in and around Kenabeek.

Most of the residents of the Kenabeek area can trace their families back two and three generations.

Boundaries and residents

In addition to the General Store and Post Office, there is a volunteer fire department and building and a community centre. The community centre is the original one-room schoolhouse which housed grades 1 to 8 until sometime in the 1960s. The current caretaker of the Community Center is Jean Byerlay.

References

External links

Communities in Timiskaming District